Songs of Experience is an illustrated collection of poems by William Blake, second book of two in Songs of Innocence and Experience.

Songs of Experience may also refer to:
Part 2 of Songs of Innocence and of Experience, musical setting of Blake's poems by William Bolcom
Songs of Experience (David Axelrod album), 1969
Songs of Experience (U2 album), 2017
"Songs of Experience", an episode of the TV series Pretty Little Liars

See also
Songs of Innocence (disambiguation)
Songs of Innocence and of Experience (disambiguation)